A leaf boat is a traditional toy made in various parts of the world using nothing but a leaf. Various types of leaves are used depending on the area, most commonly flag iris, reed leaves and bamboo leaves.

Names in other languages
 Finnish: kaislavene 'reed boat'
 German: Schilfblattboot 'reed leaf boat'
 Japanese: 竹葉舟 'bamboo leaf boat' or 笹の葉舟 'sasa leaf boat'
 Chinese:  'bamboo leaf boat' 
 Scottish Gaelic: bàta-siolastair 'iris boat'
 Spanish: barco de hoja de caña 'reed leaf boat'
 Swedish: vassbåt 'reed boat'

Process
In most cases, the process of the more complex boats involves:
 folding over the ends of the leaf
 tearing the leaf on both sides alongside of the midrib
 tucking the torn sections into each other to form the prow and stem
 folding a sail and tucking the far end into the stem.

See also
 Caballito de totora
 Reed boat
 Loi Krathong

External links
 Building a Finnish-style leaf boat
 Building a Chinese-stlye bamboo leaf boat
 Making a cattail boat

Traditional toys
Articles containing video clips